Ski Bums was a travel and social club for LGBT skiers and snowboarders, with hundreds of members from across North America. It hosted social events and group trips to ski resorts throughout North America, South America and Europe.

History
Ski Bums was founded in New York City in December 2003. The club began hosting trips in 2005. Ski Bums began with local daytrips from New York City, but within two years, began traveling to ski resorts throughout the American West. Ski Bums offered year-round vacations to ski resorts in the Northern and Southern Hemispheres, visiting mountains throughout North America, South America and Europe.

Social events
Ski bums hosted Avalanche, a party for its members and friends, at therapy, a gay bar in New York City. In the fall of 2009, Ski Bums expanded its social events to include Washington D.C., Los Angeles, Chicago, San Francisco, Salt Lake City, Denver, Atlanta and Minneapolis. In the fall of 2012, it began hosting events in London, United Kingdom. In addition, Ski Bums hosted a series of charity fund-raising events each year.

Trips
To date, Ski Bums has hosted trips to Vail, Telluride, Steamboat Springs and Aspen, Colorado, Zermatt, Switzerland, Whistler-Blackcomb, British Columbia, Jackson Hole, Wyoming, Chamonix and Courchevel France, St. Anton am Arlberg Austria, Bariloche, Argentina, Park City, Utah, and Salt Lake City, Utah, (Alta, Snowbird, Brighton, Solitude, Snowbasin), Lake Tahoe, California (Heavenly, Kirkwood and Squaw Valley), Big Sky, Montana and several resorts in Vermont, including Killington, Stratton, Stowe, and Mount Snow. It also hosts a regular season of local bus daytrips (to Hunter Mountain, Windham, Mountain Creek and Belleayre).

See also

List of LGBT-related organizations
LGBT tourism

References

"Ski Bums Is Nation's Largest Gay Ski Group" by Cyd Zeigler, Jr, Outsports.com March 3, 2010, retrieved August 11, 2010
"A Guide To Spring Skiing for LGBTs" by Matt Aldterton, Chicago Free Press, February 24, 2010, retrieved August 11, 2010
"2010 Gay Ski Week Preview: Hit The Slopes!" by Evan Merrimac, LogoTV: Trip Out December 1, 2009, retrieved August 11, 2010
"Was that Liza on the Black Diamond Run?" by Denny Lee, New York Times, February 3, 2006.
"Powder Poofs: The Gay Skiing Movement Takes Off", by Jeff Titterton, Realjock.com December 9, 2006
International Gay and Lesbian Skiing Association

External links
Outdoors listing of LGBT skiing and snowboarding clubs
Aspen Gay Ski Week
Whistler Gay Ski Week

International LGBT sports organizations
Skiing organizations
LGBT tourism